Lake Acococha (possibly from Quechua aqu sand, qucha lake) is a lake in Peru located in the Junín Region, Yauli Province, Marcapomacocha District. Lake Acococha lies southeast of lakes Marcapomacocha and Marcacocha.

References 

Lakes of Peru
Lakes of Junín Region